Here Comes the Hotstepper is a 1994 album by Jamaican reggae and dancehall artist Ini Kamoze. It was produced by Sly Dunbar and Robbie Shakespeare. It contains as title track the international hit "Here Comes the Hotstepper" that charted in the United States, UK and many European charts. The remainder of the album's tracks are re-recordings of songs that had appeared on Kamoze's first four albums: Ini Kamoze (1984), Statement (also 1984), and Pirate (1986).

Track listing
"Call the Police" (5:37)
"Rough" (3:28)
"Here Comes the Hotstepper (Heartical Mix)" (4:11)
"Gunshot" (4:57)
"World-A-Music" (3:46)
"Trouble You a Trouble Me" (3:58)
"General" (4:03)
"Pull Up the Cork" (5:50)
"Pirate" (3:43)
"Babylon, Babylon" (4:54)
"I Want Ital" (4:47)
"Burnin'" (4:51)

Personnel
Robbie Shakespeare – bass, guitar
Sly Dunbar – drums
Willie Lindo – guitar
Dean Frazer – horns
Richard Dunn – keyboards
Robbie Lyn – piano, synthesizer 
Sly Dunbar & Robbie Shakespeare – producers

References

1995 albums
Albums produced by Sly and Robbie
Reggae fusion albums